The Dallara IR-03, and its evolution, the Dallara IR-05/07, is an open-wheel formula racing car developed and produced by Italian manufacturer Dallara for use in the IndyCar one-make spec-series, between 2003 and 2011.

References

External links
Dallara's Official Website

IndyCar Series
Open wheel racing cars
IR-03
American Championship racing cars